Maen-y-groes is a hamlet in the  community of Llanllwchaiarn, Ceredigion, Wales, which is 71 miles (114.3 km) from Cardiff and 187 miles (300.9 km) from London. Maen-y-groes is represented in the Senedd by Elin Jones (Plaid Cymru) and is part of the Ceredigion constituency in the House of Commons.

Etymology
The name derives from the Welsh language: "the stone of the Cross".

References

See also
List of localities in Wales by population 

Villages in Ceredigion